George Layton (born 2 March 1943) is an English actor, director, screenwriter and author best known for three television roles – junior doctor Paul Collier in the comedy series Doctor in the House and its sequels Doctor at Large, Doctor in Charge and Doctor at the Top, that of Bombardier 'Solly' Solomons in the first two series of It Ain't Half Hot Mum, and as Des the mechanic in early episodes of Minder. He also appeared in two episodes of The Sweeney and played Norman Simmonds in EastEnders as well as a few early appearances as himself on the light entertainment BBC 1 consumer show That's Life.

Life and career 
Layton was born in Bradford, West Riding of Yorkshire, England. He was born to a family of Czechoslovak and Jewish ancestry and educated at Belle Vue Boys' Grammar School in Bradford during which time, in an interview for Talking Pictures TV Channel in April 2020, he mentioned his work on BBC Children's Hour at the former BBC Studios at Piccadilly, Manchester, where he came under the influence and guidance of Trevor Hill, Violet Carson and Doris Gamble. He then studied acting at the Royal Academy of Dramatic Art where he won the Emile Littler award. He went on to leading parts at Coventry and Nottingham and appeared on Broadway in Chips with Everything as well taking over the role of Fagin from Roy Hudd in 1979 in the first London revival of Oliver! at the Albery Theatre. He also appeared in an Australian production called Funny Peculiar.
His early television work includes Swizzlewick, Enter Solly Gold, United!, Thirty-Minute Theatre, Detective, Toast, What's in It For Me? and Lay Down Your Arms. He also made guest appearances in many classic British series, including The Likely Lads, Z-Cars, The Liver Birds, two episodes of The Sweeney, Minder and played the lead in Len and the River Mob. In 1969 he played a small role in the Doctor Who story The Space Pirates.

Later that year he made his debut as medical student Paul Collier in Doctor in the House. As well as continuing to star in the series and its sequels, in 1971, he began to co-write episodes with former co-star Jonathan Lynn, the first under the pseudonym Oliver Fry to conceal the new writer's identity from his fellow cast members.

At the end of the Doctor in Charge series in 1973 he left the show (although he stayed on as a writer), and the following year he appeared in the first two series of It Ain't Half Hot Mum as Bombardier 'Solly' Solomons. He then joined forces with Jonathan Lynn once again to co-write and co-star in another sitcom My Brother's Keeper. He also appeared in Carry On Behind in 1975 playing a hospital doctor.

Layton was also one of the main presenters on the original series of That's Life!, hosted by Esther Rantzen.

His other television writing credits with Jonathan Lynn include episodes of On the Buses, Nearest and Dearest, Romany Jones and My Name Is Harry Worth.

In the mid-1970s, he and Lynn began to write separately, and Layton became a regular writer of Robin's Nest, in which he also played a guest character. Following this, he created and wrote the sitcoms Don't Wait Up starring Nigel Havers and Tony Britton and Executive Stress with Geoffrey Palmer and Penelope Keith. In 1990, Don't Wait Up won the Television and Radio Industries Club's 'Best Comedy Series' award. 
In the 1980s,he played the recurring character ‘Des’in the hit comedy-drama Minder. In a 2021 interview with Paul Stenning, Layton described how he left Minder temporarily as he had committed to a pantomime and now bitterly regrets he lost his role in the show.

Layton provided voices for the children's cartoons Pigeon Street and Joshua Jones, and was the voice behind Sydney, a character in the long-running advertising campaign for Tetley tea.

After a brief return to the role of Paul Collier in 1991's Doctor at the Top, he starred in the hit comedy-drama series Sunburn (1999–2000), playing Alan Brooks, area manager of Janus Holidays in Cyprus. His most recent acting appearances have been in Doctors, Holby City and Casualty. In 2006, he made five appearances in Dictionary Corner on the game show Countdown and made a guest appearance in an episode of Heartbeat.

On 18 January 1999 Layton was the subject of This Is Your Life. He has also appeared on Lily Savage's Blankety Blank. Layton's less well-known voiceover work includes TV commercials for various financial products, and narration of promotional videos for property speculators Inside Track.

In August 2012 Layton competed in Celebrity Masterchef.

Author 
Layton has written three books of short stories, entitled The Fib and Other Stories, The Swap and Other Stories and The Trick and Other Stories. The tales describe family life in the North of England in the post-Second World War era. The books have been part of the National Curriculum in British schools, and film versions are being planned. Myles McDowell quotes Layton's The Balaclava Story as an example of how adults are often mostly absent from children's fiction.

Filmography

Film

Television

Selected theatre 
As actor:
Billy Liar as Geoffrey Fisher (King's Head, Islington)
The Caucasian Chalk Circle as Lavrenti (Belgrade Theatre, Coventry)
Chicago as Amos Hart (Adelphi Theatre, London)
Chips With Everything as First Corporal (Royal Court and Broadway)
How to Succeed in Business Without Really Trying as Ponty (New Theatre, Bromley)
More Lies About Jerzy as Jerzy Kosinski (New End Theatre, Hampstead)
The Odd Couple as Felix (Theatre Royal, Windsor)
Oliver! as Fagin Albery Theatre 1978/9 then at the(London Palladium)
Twelfth Night as Feste (Belgrade Theatre, Coventry)

As director:
Barefoot in the Park (Cambridge Theatre Company)
Dangerous Corner (Cambridge Theatre Company)
Aladdin (Theatre Royal, Bath)
Dick Whittington (Shaw Theatre)

References

External links
 
 
 

1943 births
Living people
20th-century British short story writers
20th-century English male writers
20th-century English male actors
21st-century English male actors
20th-century English writers
Male actors from Bradford
English male film actors
English male radio actors
English male stage actors
English male television actors
English male short story writers
English short story writers
Male actors from Yorkshire
Alumni of RADA
People educated at Belle Vue Boys' Grammar School, Bradford